Delphine Dryden (born December 1, 1967) is an American author of contemporary romance, erotic romance and steampunk romance fiction.

Career
Dryden was first published in 2008 and has since published over twenty novels and novellas . She currently writes for Berkley Publishing and Harlequin (Carina Press and Cosmo Red Hot Reads from Harlequin). Dryden’s work, in particular the award-winning novel The Theory of Attraction, has frequently been cited as an example of nerd romance Dryden has also received critical praise for her steampunk novels. Dryden has been a speaker at events such as the Romantic Times Booklovers Convention, the Romance Writers of America National Conference, and Comicpalooza. Dryden is also a founding member of and regular contributor to the romance, writing and culture blog Wonkomance.com.

Personal life
Dryden currently lives near her hometown of Houston, Texas.

Honors
2012 Romantic Times Magazine July Seal of Excellence Winner (The Theory of Attraction)
2012 Romantic Times Magazine Reviewers’ Choice Award Winner (The Theory of Attraction)
2012 Colorado Romance Writers Award of Excellence Winner (The Theory of Attraction)
 2013 Phoenix Romance Writers Golden Quill Contest Finalist (The Theory of Attraction)
 2013 EPIC (Electronic Publishing Industry Coalition) Ebook Award Winner (Love With a Chance of Zombies)
 2013 EPIC (Electronic Publishing Industry Coalition) Ebook Award Finalist (The Lamplighter’s Love)
 2013 Romantic Times Magazine Reviewers’ Choice Award Nominee (The Seduction Hypothesis)

Bibliography
The Science of Temptation series (Carina Press):

 The Theory of Attraction (January 2012)
 The Seduction Hypothesis (May 2013)
 The Principle of Desire (December 2013)

The Steam and Seduction series (Berkley Sensation):
 Gossamer Wing (November 2013)
 Scarlet Devices (February 2014)
 Gilded Lily (July 2014)

The Tropical Trysts series (Cosmo Red Hot Reads from Harlequin):
 Mai Tai for Two (May 2014)
 Sex on the Beach (July 2014)

The Truth and Lies series (Ellora’s Cave):
 How to Tell a Lie (November 2009)
 Art of the Lie (September 2010)
 Naked Truth (October 2010)
 Tangled Truth (June 2011)
 Tell Me No Lies (November 2012)

Other Titles (Ellora’s Cave):
 Snow Job (November 2008)	
 When in Rio (February 2009)
 Xmas Spark (December 2010)
 Roses and Chains (April 2011)
 The Lamplighter’s Love (September 2011)
 Love With a Chance of Zombies (September 2011)
 Toy Box (September 2012)
 Intermezzo (March 2013)

References

External links
 Official Website
 Facebook Author Page
 Berkley
 Harlequin

Writers from Houston
Writers from Texas
Steampunk writers
Living people
American romantic fiction writers
1967 births
Place of birth missing (living people)